Bernard Ukeiwé (24 June 1953 - 23 July 2008) was a New Caledonian politician and footballer.  The son of former senator Dick Ukeiwé, he played for the New Caledonia national football team.  A Kanak, he opposed independence from France.

1953 births
2008 deaths
New Caledonian footballers
New Caledonia international footballers
New Caledonia politicians
Kanak people
Black French politicians
Association footballers not categorized by position
1973 Oceania Cup players